The Armenian Evangelical Shamlian Tatigian Secondary School is located in Bourj Hammoud, a suburb to the north east of Beirut, Lebanon. It began in 1934 as Nor Marash Armenian Evangelical School with kindergarten and primary classes only. In 1964 Mr. and Mrs. G. Shamlian and their son Mr. J. Tatigian contributed to the school a new modern building and the school was renamed the Armenian Evangelical Shamlian-Tatigian Secondary School. Now the school has 300 pupils and kindergarten, primary and secondary classes.

History
The New Marash Armenian Evangelical School started in 1930 in Nor Marash in Bourj Hammoud area. It was mainly inhabited by Armenians who came from Cilicia, Anatolia after the 1915 Armenian Genocide. The school known as the Nor Marash Armenian Evangelical School had a kindergarten and two elementary classes. 

The school developed through the years from this. In 1936 Reverend Garabed Hassessian increased the number of elementary classes to six. Subsequent to this, Reverend Aram Hadidian added several more classes. In 1950, four intermediate grades of the second cycle were added. Then, in 1958, the three secondary grades of the third cycle were certified.

In 1964 the name was changed to Armenian Evangelical Shamlian-Tatigian Secondary School after Mr. and Mrs. J. Shamlian and their son Mr. G. Tatigian contributed money to the school to build a new modern building. The school compound also includes the Nor Marsh Armenian Evangelical Church.

See also
Armenian Evangelical School of Trad (Trad, Lebanon)
Armenian Evangelical Peter and Elizabeth Torosian School (Amanos, Lebanon)
Armenian Evangelical Guertmenian School (Ashrafieh, Lebanon)
Armenian Evangelical Central High School (Ashrafieh, Lebanon)
Yeprem and Martha Philibosian Armenian Evangelical College (Beirut, Lebanon)
Armenian Evangelical Secondary School of Anjar (Anjar, Lebanon)

External links
Educational Council of the Union of the Armenian Evangelical Churches in the Near East (UAECNE)

Schools in Lebanon
Armenian Evangelical schools
Educational institutions established in 1934
1934 establishments in Lebanon